Allsvenskan 1927–28, part of the 1927–28 Swedish football season, was the fourth Allsvenskan season played. The first match was played 31 July 1927 and the last match was played 3 June 1928. Örgryte IS won the league ahead of runners-up Hälsingborgs IF, while Djurgårdens IF and Stattena IF were relegated.

Participating clubs

League table

Promotions, relegations and qualifications

Results

Attendances

Top scorers

References 

Print

Online

Allsvenskan seasons
1927–28 in Swedish association football leagues
Sweden